= Osman Niyazi Burcu =

Turkish politician

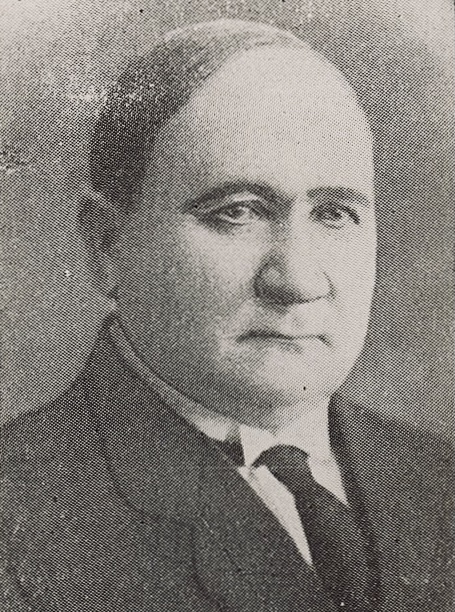

Member of the Grand National Assembly

Personal details
- Born: 1875 Balıkesir, Ottoman Empire
- Died: 17 June 1955 (aged 79–80)

Osman Niyazi Burcu (1875 – 17 June 1955) was a Turkish Kemalist politician, and a prominent member of the CHP.
